Agdistis frankeniae is a moth in the family Pterophoridae. It is found from Siberia through Central Asia, the northern parts of Asia and North Africa along the Mediterranean and in the west from the Canary Islands to southern France.

The wingspan is about 29 mm.

The larvae feed on Limonium minutum and Frankenia species.

References

Agdistinae
Moths of Europe
Moths described in 1847
Moths of Africa
Moths of Asia